"Some Boys! Touch" is Maki Goto's 16th single. It was released on October 11, 2006 in both 
limited (PKCP-5070~1) and regular (PKCP-5072) editions. The Single V DVD did come out two weeks later on October 25, 2006 with the catalog number PKBP-5055. The B-side, "All of Us", is used as the first ending theme song to the anime Ginga Tetsudou Monogatari ~Eien e no Bunkiten~.

Some Boys! Touch is also the third track of Goto's fourth album, How to Use Sexy.

Credits 

 SOME BOYS! TOUCH
 Lyrics: Tsunku
 Composer: Tsunku
 Arrangement: Tanaka Nao
 ALL OF US
 Lyrics: Tsunku
 Composer: Tsunku
 Arrangement: Suzuki Shunsuke

CD track listing 

 SOME BOYS! TOUCH
 ALL OF US
 SOME BOYS! TOUCH (Instrumental)

DVD track listing 

 SOME BOYS! TOUCH
 SOME BOYS! TOUCH (Dance Shot)
 メイキング映像 (Making of)

TV performances 

 2006-10-06 Music Fighter
 2006-10-08 Hello! Morning
 2006-10-14 POP JAM
 2006-10-21 Music Fair 21

Concert performances 

 Goto Maki Live Tour 2006 ~G Emotion~
 Hello! Project 2007 Winter ~Shuuketsu! 10th Anniversary~
 Hello! Project Tour Winter 2007 ~Elder Club THE CELEBRATION~

Oricon Rank and Sales 

Total sales: 29,459*

External links 

 Up-Front Works discography entries: CD, DVD

2006 singles
Songs written by Tsunku
Maki Goto songs